2010 Australian floods can refer to:

 March 2010 Queensland floods
 2010 Victorian floods
 2010–2011 Queensland floods

See also
 Floods in Australia